Theo P. Adams (born April 24, 1966) is a former American football offensive lineman. Originally signed as an undrafted free agent by the Los Angeles Rams, he was part of the inaugural London Monarchs that won the World Bowl '91. Adams later played for the NFL's Seattle Seahawks and Tampa Bay Buccaneers.

References 

1966 births
Living people
American football offensive linemen
Hawaii Rainbow Warriors football players
London Monarchs players
Seattle Seahawks players
Tampa Bay Buccaneers players
Frankfurt Galaxy players
San Jose SaberCats players
Players of American football from San Francisco